Leistarcha thaumastica is a moth in the family Xyloryctidae. It was described by Turner in 1946. It is found in Australia, where it has been recorded from New South Wales.

References

Leistarcha
Moths described in 1946